Holbrook is an unincorporated community in Multnomah County, Oregon, United States. It is located on U.S. Route 30 about 15 miles northwest of Portland between the Tualatin Mountains and the Multnomah Channel south of Sauvie Island. Holbrook's elevation is 135 feet above sea level.

The community was named for pioneer Philo Holbrook, who owned a farm nearby. Holbrook had a post office from 1887 to 1933.

References 

Unincorporated communities in Multnomah County, Oregon
1887 establishments in Oregon
Populated places established in 1887
Unincorporated communities in Oregon